Luis López (born 14 July 1949) is a Costa Rican long-distance runner. He competed in the men's marathon at the 1988 Summer Olympics and the 1992 Summer Olympics.

References

1949 births
Living people
Athletes (track and field) at the 1988 Summer Olympics
Athletes (track and field) at the 1992 Summer Olympics
Costa Rican male long-distance runners
Costa Rican male marathon runners
Olympic athletes of Costa Rica
Place of birth missing (living people)
Central American Games silver medalists for Costa Rica
Central American Games medalists in athletics
20th-century Costa Rican people
21st-century Costa Rican people